Ernest Edward Whitcombe (31 March 1913 – 16 January 1997) was an English professional golfer. He was the son of Ernest Whitcombe and was always known as Eddie.

In the 1937 Daily Mirror Assistants' Tournament, Whitcombe was tied after 72 holes with Albert Chevalier on 289. In the 36-hole playoff the following day Chevalier beat Whitcombe by a shot, scoring 145 to Whitcombe's 146. Whitcombe had a yard putt at the last to tie but missed.

In April 1938, he finished joint second in the Silver King Tournament, two strokes behind his uncle Charles. Later in 1938, he lost 4&3 in the 36-hole final of the News of the World Match Play to Dai Rees. Whitcombe and Rees were born on the same day, 31 March 1913. In 1938, he also played for England against Scotland and for England in the Llandudno International Golf Trophy.

Whitcombe was chairman of the PGA from 1970 to 1972.

Results in major championships

Note: Whitcombe only played in The Open Championship.

NT = No tournament
CUT = missed the half-way cut
"T" indicates a tie for a place

Team appearances
England–Scotland Professional Match (representing England): 1938 (winners)
Llandudno International Golf Trophy (representing England): 1938 (winners)

Further reading

References

English male golfers
Sportspeople from Norfolk
1913 births
1997 deaths